Mota Lava or Motalava is an island of the Banks group, in the north of Vanuatu. It forms a single coral system with the small island of Ra.

The 2009 census figures give a population of 1640 inhabitants (Mota Lava + Ra), which amounts to a population density of 67 people per km².

Geography

Geography and geology
With an area of 24 km2 (9.3 sq mi), Mota Lava is the fourth largest island in the Banks Islands, after Gaua, Vanua Lava and Ureparapara. It is the highest of the eastern chain of islands, as well as the largest.

It is attached to it by high corals that one can wade through at low tide.

The climate on Mota Lava is humid tropical. The average annual rainfall exceeds 4000 mm. The island is subject to frequent earthquakes and cyclones.

The island is served by Mota Lava Airport.

Geology 
Mota Lava is composed of at least five basaltic stratovolcanoes. Two of the cones, Vetman and Tuntog, are well-preserved. Vetman is a pyroclastic cone in the centre of the island with a breached summit crater.

Geochemical analysis shows that the island's lava has a similar composition to that from nearby Mota and Ureparapara, as well as lava from the south of the country, but differs from material erupted in central Vanuatu. The latter region has been affected by the subduction of a submerged, extinct island arc complex called the D'Entrecasteaux Zone.

Name and language
In early 19th-century texts and maps, Mota Lava was called Saddle Island, after the distinctive saddle-shaped profile it presents when seen from a boat offshore.

The inhabitants of Mota Lava call the island Mwotlap, locally spelled M̄otlap.

The language spoken by the inhabitants of Motalava is also called Mwotlap. It is the most widely spoken language in the Banks Islands, with about 2,100 speakers. The recently extinct Volow language also used to be spoken on Mota Lava.

An early attempt to transcribe the native name, both for the island and the language, yielded a form Motlav.

The name Mota Lava  (or Motalava) caught on after it started being used by 19th-century missionaries to the island. They borrowed that name from the language spoken on neighbouring Mota. Both the Mota and Mwotlap names of the island descend from a protoform *Mʷota lava in Proto-Torres-Banks, literally "large Mota".

History
Archaeologists have found ancient obsidian in Motalava, Vanua Lava and Gaua, and they have found Lapita pottery on Motalava.

The island was first sighted by Europeans during the Spanish expedition of Pedro Fernández de Quirós, from 25 to 29 April 1606. The island’s name was then charted as Lágrimas de San Pedro (“St. Peter's Tears”, in Spanish).

Notes and references

Notes

References

External links
 An introduction to the culture of Mota Lava and its surroundings – featuring photos, maps, access to linguistic documents and traditional stories (site of the linguist Alexandre François)
  A Journey to Motalava (Promenade ethnolinguistique à Motalava)

Islands of Vanuatu
Volcanoes of Vanuatu
Torba Province